USS High Ball has been the name of more than one United States Navy ship, and may refer to:

, a patrol boat in commission from 1917 to 1919
, also written Highball, a patrol boat briefly in commission during late 1918

High Ball